Sakeji may refer to:
 Sakeji River, a tributary of the Zambezi.
 Sakeji School, a school near Kalene Hill in the Mwinilunga District of northwest Zambia
 Sakeji Horseshoe Bat, a species of bat in the family Rhinolophidae endemic to Zambia